Hossein Namazi (born 1945) is an Iranian economist and academic, who served in different cabinet posts.

Early life and education
Namazi was born in 1945. He received a PhD in economics in Austria.

Career
Namazi is an economist and academic. He served as the minister of finance in different governments of Iran. First he served in this post from March 1981 to 1985. In 1985 he was approved for the post by the Majlis, getting 106 for votes.

He was reappointed as minister of finance to the cabinet led by President Mohammad Khatami in August 1997. He succeeded Morteza Mohammadkhan in the post. When Namazi was in office, there was a rivalry between him and Mohsen Nourbakhsh, governor of Central Bank of Iran. Namazi's term ended in August 2001, and he was replaced by Tahmasb Mazaheri in the post.

Views
Namazi strongly supported social justice in Iran. He rejected the relaxing restrictions on imports of foreign goods, especially cars, and preferred restrictive labour laws.

References

External links

20th-century economists
1945 births
Living people
Iranian economists
Finance ministers of Iran
Islamic Republican Party politicians